Oak Hill Cemetery is a cemetery in Newnan, Coweta County, Georgia. It was added to the National Register of Historic Places on January 27, 2012. It is located at 96 Jefferson Street in Newnan.

History
The Oak Hill Cemetery was founded in 1833. 268 Confederate Army soldiers are buried at Oak Hill and two are labeled as "Unknown".

Notable interments
 Ellis Arnall (1907–1992), Governor of Georgia
 William Yates Atkinson (1854–1899), Governor of Georgia
 Hugh Buchanan (1823–1890), U.S. Representative from Georgia
 Albert Sidney Camp (1892–1954), U.S. Representative from Georgia
 James C. Davis (1895–1981), U.S. Representative from Georgia
 William Barton Wade Dent (1806–1855), U.S. Representative from Georgia
 Charles L. Moses (1856–1910), U.S. Representative from Georgia
 Jesse Calaway Wootten (1836–1874), newspaperman and founder of Newnan Times-Herald
 William C. Wright (1866–1933), U.S. Representative from Georgia

See also
 National Register of Historic Places listings in Coweta County, Georgia

References

1833 establishments in Georgia (U.S. state)
Buildings and structures in Coweta County, Georgia
National Register of Historic Places in Coweta County, Georgia
Cemeteries on the National Register of Historic Places in Georgia (U.S. state)